The 1923 Duquesne Dukes football team represented Duquesne University during the 1923 college football season. The head coach was Harold Ballin, coaching his second season with the Dukes.

Schedule

References

Duquesne
Duquesne Dukes football seasons
Duquesne Dukes football